Paus & Paus AS is a former industrial company in Norway, active within the pulp and paper industry, chemical industry and pharmaceutical industry. It existed from 1906 from 2001, when it was acquired by Pemco. A number of former subsidiary companies still exist. For many years it was one of the larger pulp and paper companies in eastern Norway.

The company was founded by Alf Paus (1869–1945) and Georg F. Helmer and named Helmer & Paus in 1906. Three years later, Helmer left the company and Alf Paus' brother Nicolay (Nissen) Paus became the new partner, and the company was renamed Paus & Paus. From 1914, it was headquartered in Christiania and it became a limited company from 1918. In 1920 Alf and Nicolay Paus acquired almost all of the shares of the factory Den Norske Papirfiltfabrik in Drammen, which thus became a subsidiary company of Paus & Paus.

References

Defunct companies of Norway
Paus family
Manufacturing companies established in 1906
Manufacturing companies disestablished in 2001
Norwegian companies established in 1906
2001 disestablishments in Norway